Pune is a city in the state of Maharashtra in India. It is situated in western Maharashtra on the Deccan Plateau. Pune's public transport consists primarily of a bus service, a suburban rail service, metro, public taxis and auto rickshaws. In 2020 it was awarded the Sustainable Transport Award.

Road

Pune is well-connected to rest of the country by national highways and state highways. National highways passing through the city are NH 48, NH 65 and NH 60. State highways passing through the city are MSH 27. The Mumbai Pune Expressway, India's first six-lane expressway, was built in 2002, and significantly reduces the distance traveled by NH 48 between these cities.

A ring road is being planned around the city.

Bus

Public buses within the city and its suburbs are operated by the Pune Mahanagar Parivahan Mahamandal Limited (PMPML). The PMPML operates the Rainbow Bus Rapid Transit System system, the first in India, in which dedicated bus lanes exists to allow buses to travel quicker through the city.

Maharashtra State Road Transport Corporation (MSRTC) runs buses, popularly known as ST (State Transport), from its three main bus stations in Shivajinagar, Pune Station and Swargate to all major cities and towns in Maharashtra and neighbouring states. Private companies too run buses to major cities throughout India.

Rail

The city's main railway station is Pune Railway Station. The station is administrated by the Pune Railway Division of the Central Railways. There are many other railway stations within the urban area. Daily express trains connect Pune to major cities in the country. At Pune, there is diesel locomotive shed and electric trip shed.

Pune Suburban Railway

Pune Suburban Railway is a suburban rail system connecting Pune to its suburbs and neighboring villages in Pune District, Maharashtra. It is operated by Central Railway. Pune's suburban railway operates on two routes, i.e. from Pune Junction to Lonavla and its part, from Pune Junction to Talegaon. There are 5 trains which operate on Pune Junction - Talegaon route while 18 trains operate on Pune Junction - Lonavla route.

Pune Metro 

Pune Metro is a currently under construction rapid transit system to serve the cities of Pune and Pimpri-Chinchwad. As of March 2018, Line 1 (Pimpri-Chinchwad - Swargate) and Line 2 (Vanaz - Ramwadi) with a combined length of 31.25 km are being constructed by Maharashtra Metro Rail Corporation Limited (MahaMetro), a 50:50 joint venture of the State and Central Governments. Lines 1 and 2 opened on March 6, 2022 with 12 km in operation. Line 3, which will cover a distance of 23.3 km between Hinjawadi and Shivajinagar, has been approved by the State and Central Governments. The Pune Metropolitan Region Development Authority (PMRDA) will implement the project on a public–private partnership (PPP) basis, for which it has shortlisted three companies: Tata Realty and Siemens, IRB in consortium with Chinese and Malaysian companies, and IL&FS. The bidding for Line 3 is expected by June 2018. All three lines will align at the Civil Court interchange station.

Air

Pune Airport is an international airport at Lohegaon, operated by the Airports Authority of India. It shares its runways with the neighbouring Indian Air Force base. In addition to domestic flights to all major Indian cities, this airport serves international direct flights to Dubai (operated by Air India Express) and to Frankfurt (operated by Lufthansa).

Chhatrapati Sambhaji Raje International Airport is a proposed greenfield international airport to serve the city of Pune, India. The airport will be located near the villages of Ambodi, Sonori, Kumbharvalan, Ekhatpur-Munjawadi, Khanwadi, Pargaon Memane, Rajewadi, Aamble, Tekwadi, Vanpuri, Udachiwadi, Singapur near Saswad and Jejuri in Purandar taluka of Pune District in the Indian state of Maharashtra.

See also 
 Public transport in Mumbai

References